Chinese Lessons: Five Classmates and the Story of the New China recounts John Pomfret's experiences and perspectives about the then opening China during his attendance of Nanjing University in 1980, during one of the first student exchange programs between the United States and China. The book received positive reviews in major American newspapers, such as The New York Times. It is widely read among the ethnic Chinese community in the United States.

It was first published by Henry Holt and Co. on 8 August 2006.

References

External links
John Pomfret's official web site

Books about China
2006 non-fiction books
Henry Holt and Company books
Nanjing University